The Levi RL3 Monsoon is an Indian homebuilt aircraft that was developed in the late 1950s. It was also marketed as the AFCO Shipyard company RL.3 Monsoon and Western Aircraft Supplies Monsoon.

Design and development
The RL3 Monsoon is a side-by-side configuration, two seat, low wing aircraft of wood and fabric construction, equipped with conventional landing gear. It was designed and tested in India by "Sonny" Renato Levi, an Italian designer who had joined the Royal Air Force in England, studied aircraft design, and become a boat designer in Italy.

Specifications (RL3 Monsoon)

See also

References

External links
Photo of the Levi RL3 Monsoon

Homebuilt aircraft